Albert, Duke of Schleswig-Holstein (Albert John Charles Frederick Alfred George; 26 February 1869 – 27 April 1931), was a grandson of Queen Victoria. He was the second son of Victoria's daughter Princess Helena by her husband Prince Christian of Schleswig-Holstein. Prince Albert was the head of the House of Oldenburg, and also the House of Schleswig-Holstein-Sonderburg-Augustenburg and the fourth Duke of Schleswig-Holstein between 1921 and 1931.

Early life and military career

Prince Albert grew up at Cumberland Lodge in Windsor Great Park. He was known as "Abby" to his family. He was baptised in the private chapel at Windsor Castle on 31 March 1869. His godparents were the Dowager Queen of Denmark (represented by Queen Victoria), the Princess of Wales (represented by Princess Louise), Princess Louis of Hesse and by Rhine (represented by the Duchess of Roxburghe), the Duke of Edinburgh (represented by Prince Arthur), the Duke of Schleswig-Holstein (represented by Prince Leopold), the King of Saxony (represented by Baron Oswald von Fabrice) and the Duke of Cambridge.

Like his elder brother, Prince Christian Victor, whom he followed to Lambrook Preparatory School in Berkshire, Albert was destined for a military career. However, while Christian Victor's was in the British Army, Albert served with the Prussian Army.  He was commissioned Lieutenant into the 1st Hessian Dragoon Guards eventually reaching the rank of lieutenant colonel in the 3rd Uhlans of the Guard. During World War I he was excused from service against the British by the German Emperor, and spent the war in Berlin on the staff of the Governor of the city.

Duchy
In 1921, the Prince succeeded as the head of the Schleswig-Holstein-Sonderburg-Augustenburg of the House of Schleswig-Holstein, following his childless cousin Duke Ernst Gunther of Schleswig-Holstein-Sonderburg-Augustenburg. This was the senior branch of the House of Oldenburg, to which the Duke of Schleswig-Holstein, the Emperor of Russia, the King of Denmark, the King of Norway, the King of the Hellenes and the Grand Duke of Oldenburg belonged.

Succession
As the Duke of Schleswig-Holstein and as the Head of the House of Oldenburg, Duke Albert was succeeded by his distant cousin Friedrich Ferdinand, Duke of Schleswig-Holstein-Sonderburg-Glücksburg (who happened to be also the husband of a daughter of Albert's uncle Frederick VIII, Duke of Schleswig-Holstein-Sonderburg-Augustenburg).

Issue

Prince Albert never married, but he fathered an illegitimate daughter, Valerie Marie. Born 3 April 1900 in Liptovský Mikuláš, Hungary, Austria-Hungary, she was placed almost immediately after her birth with Anna Rosenthal and her husband Rubin Schwalb, of Jewish origin. On 15 April 1931, shortly before his death, Albert wrote to her, admitting to her his paternity. After this, on 12 May she changed her surname from Schwalb, the name of her foster family, to "zu Schleswig-Holstein".

The name of Valerie Marie's mother was never made public.  Albert told no one.  He did inform his two sisters that the woman was of "high noble birth".

On 28 June 1925, in Vienna, Valerie Marie (before Albert's acknowledgement of paternity) married the lawyer Ernst Johann Wagner, but divorced him on 14 February 1938; the childless marriage was formally annulled in Salzburg on 4 October 1940. When she intended to marry again, it became important to establish her parentage officially, as the Nuremberg Laws prohibited marriages between Jews and Aryans. This was done with the assistance of her aunts, Princesses Helena Victoria and Marie Louise; they signed a statement attesting to her paternal lineage on 26 July 1938, officially acknowledging her.

In Berlin-Charlottenburg on 15 June 1939, a civil marriage took place between her and Prince Engelbert-Charles, 10th Duke of Arenberg (1899-1974), and, after the annulment of her first marriage a religious ceremony took place in Münster near Westfalen, on 9 October 1940; like her first marriage, this union was childless too. Valerie Marie died in Mont-Baron, Nice, France, on 14 April 1953 in an apparent suicide.

Honours and awards

Orders and decorations
 :
 Knight Grand Cross of the Royal Victorian Order, 30 June 1897
 Knight Grand Cross of the Order of the Bath (civil division), 27 November 1900
 Knight of Justice of the Venerable Order of Saint John
 :
 Grand Cross of the Order of the Red Eagle
 Service Award Cross
  Duchy of Anhalt: Grand Cross of the Order of Albert the Bear, 1891
    Ernestine duchies: Grand Cross of the Saxe-Ernestine House Order
 : Grand Cross of the Ludwig Order, 25 November 1898
 : Knight of the Order of Saint Vladimir, 4th Class
 : Grand Cross of the Order of the White Falcon

Military appointments
 Major general à la suite of the Prussian Army

Ancestry

References

House of Augustenburg
1869 births
1931 deaths
Military personnel from Berkshire
People from Windsor, Berkshire
People from Old Windsor
Princes of Schleswig-Holstein-Sonderburg-Augustenburg
Knights of Justice of the Order of St John
Knights Grand Cross of the Order of the Bath
Knights Grand Cross of the Royal Victorian Order
Recipients of the Order of St. Vladimir, 4th class